Mathias Jamtvedt (14 August 1922 – 15 October 2000) was a Norwegian gymnast. He competed in eight events at the 1952 Summer Olympics.

References

1922 births
2000 deaths
Norwegian male artistic gymnasts
Olympic gymnasts of Norway
Gymnasts at the 1952 Summer Olympics
Sportspeople from Skien